Kalloch is a surname. Notable people with the surname include:

 (1958–), German theologian, a signator of Church 2011
Isaac Smith Kalloch (1832–1887), American Baptist minister and politician
Robert Kalloch (1893–1947), American fashion designer